Jewell railway station is located on the Upfield line in Victoria, Australia. It serves the northern Melbourne suburb of Brunswick, and it opened on 9 September 1884 as South Brunswick. It was renamed Jewell on 1 February 1954.

A disused goods shed is located next to the entrance to Platform 1, whilst a disused signal box is located at the Down end of the station, next to the Union Street level crossing. The main station building, signal box and level crossing gates are listed on the Victorian Heritage Register.

History

Jewell station opened on 9 September 1884, when the railway line from North Melbourne was extended to Coburg. It was renamed in honour of a long-serving member of the State Parliament, James Jewell, who represented the Brunswick electorate from 1910 to 1949.

In 1971, automatic signalling was provided between Jewell and Royal Park, replacing Double Line Block signalling. A goods yard once existed at the station, which was closed to traffic in 1977. Former siding "B" was also abolished in that year.

In 1997, siding "A", a crossover, and a number of points and signal discs at the station were abolished. In August 1998, the former level crossing at Barkly Street, which was located at the Up end of the station, was closed to vehicle traffic.

In June 2012, VicTrack announced its intention to revamp the station, as part of a mixed development that could include station restoration, enhanced open space and a new commercial and residential development, adjacent to the eastern side of the station. A program of community consultation was undertaken to find out local people's priorities for any alterations. Safety and better access were identified as main the concerns. VicTrack is to seek interest from developers in 2013. In 2018, upgrades to the station were completed.

Announced in September 2022, Jewell, alongside other stations on the Upfield line, will be elevated to remove eight level crossings on the line. Further details, designs and a construction timeline will be released closer to 2027.

Platforms and services

Jewell has two side platforms. It is served by Metro Trains' Upfield line services.

Platform 1:
  all stations services to Flinders Street.

Platform 2:
  all stations services to Upfield.

Transport links

Dysons operates one route via Jewell station, under contract to Public Transport Victoria:
 : Brunswick West – Barkly Square Shopping Centre

Yarra Trams operates one route via Jewell station:
 : North Coburg – Flinders Street station (Elizabeth Street CBD)

Gallery

References

External links
 
 Melway map at street-directory.com.au

Railway stations in Melbourne
Railway stations in Australia opened in 1884
Listed railway stations in Australia
Railway stations in the City of Merri-bek
Heritage-listed buildings in Melbourne